Xyloplax turnerae is a sea daisy, a member of an unusual group of marine taxa belonging to the phylum Echinodermata. It has been found living on decaying timber in a deep oceanic trench in the Bahamas.

Discovery
An enigmatic new species of echinoderm, Xyloplax medusiformis, was discovered in the South Pacific near New Zealand and first described in 1986 by Baker, Rowe and Clark. Further deep sea exploration by the same team using a submersible vehicle led to the discovery of a new species of Xyloplax. When recovered nearly two years later they yielded more than two hundred specimens of Xyloplax turnerae. It has since been named Xyloplax janetae.

Description
Xyloplax turnerae is very much like Xyloplax medusiformis in appearance. It is shaped like a flattened disc and is fringed by a row of short spines which are all of approximately equal length in the range 300–400 μm. The aboral (upper) surface is clad in a series of concentric plates each bearing three spines. The tube feet have rounded bulbous tips. On the oral (lower) side the mouth leads to an eversible stomach but there is no gut or anus. There is a single row of tube feet circling the mouth and these number up to 110 while X. medusiformis has fewer than 65. All the embryos found in the females were small, less than 180 μm in diameter, and it seems unlikely that this species broods its young in the same way that X. medusiformis does. The marginal spines are mobile and are disproportionally longer in smaller individuals than they are in larger ones. It is thought that juveniles may use them to "parachute" and that this may aid in their dispersal.

References

Peripodida
Animals described in 1988